SLU may refer to:

Universities
St. Lawrence University, Canton, New York, US
Saint Louis University (Philippines), Baguio City, Benguet
Saint Louis University, St. Louis, Missouri, US
Sveriges Lantbruksuniversitet (Swedish University of Agricultural Sciences), Uppsala

Places
George F. L. Charles Airport, Castries, Saint Lucia, IATA code
Siu Lun stop, Hong Kong, MTR station code
South Lake Union, Seattle

Other
Special Liaison Unit, delivering WWII Ultra intelligence
 Schedule loss of use
 Sociedad de la responsabilidad limitada unipersonal, a Spanish single-person limited liability company